Proffit Mountain is a mountain located in Reynolds County, Missouri, the highest in the county. It is the location of the upper reservoir for the Taum Sauk Hydroelectric Power Station.

See also
List of mountain peaks of Missouri

References

Landforms of Reynolds County, Missouri
Mountains of Missouri